The Egyptian Records in Swimming represent the fastest times a swimmer representing Egypt ever swam. These records are kept/maintained by the Egyptian Swimming Federation.

Records are recognized for both males and females in the following long course (50m) and short course (25m) events:
freestyle: 50, 100, 200, 400, 800 and 1500;
backstroke: 50, 100 and 200;
breaststroke: 50, 100 and 200;
butterfly: 50, 100 and 200;
individual medley (I.M.): 100 (25m only), 200 and 400;
relays: 4x50 free (25m only), 4x100 free, 4x200 free, 10x25 free (25m only), 10x50 free (50m only), 4x50 medley, and 4x100 medley.

All records were set in finals unless noted otherwise.

Long course (50m)

Men

|-bgcolor=#DDDDDD
|colspan=9|
|-

|-bgcolor=#DDDDDD
|colspan=9|
|-

|-bgcolor=#DDDDDD
|colspan=9|
|-

|-bgcolor=#DDDDDD
|colspan=9|
|-

|-bgcolor=#DDDDDD
|colspan=9|
|-

Women

|-bgcolor=#DDDDDD
|colspan=9|
|-

|-bgcolor=#DDDDDD
|colspan=9|
|-

|-bgcolor=#DDDDDD
|colspan=9|
|-

|-bgcolor=#DDDDDD
|colspan=9|
|-

|-bgcolor=#DDDDDD
|colspan=9|
|-

Mixed relay

Short course (25m)

Men

|-bgcolor=#DDDDDD
|colspan=9|
|-

|-bgcolor=#DDDDDD
|colspan=9|
|-

|-bgcolor=#DDDDDD
|colspan=9|
|-

|-bgcolor=#DDDDDD
|colspan=9|
|-

|-bgcolor=#DDDDDD
|colspan=9|
|-

Women

|-bgcolor=#DDDDDD
|colspan=9|
|-

|-bgcolor=#DDDDDD
|colspan=9|
|-

|-bgcolor=#DDDDDD
|colspan=9|
|-

|-bgcolor=#DDDDDD
|colspan=9|
|-

|-bgcolor=#DDDDDD
|colspan=9|
|-

Mixed relay

References
General
Egypt Long Course Records – Men 30 July 2022 updated
Egypt Long Course Records – Women 30 July 2022 updated
Egypt Short Course Records – Men 31 March 2019 updated
Egypt Long Short Records – Women 31 March 2019 updated
Specific

External links
 ESF web site
 ESF records page

Egypt
Records
Swimming
Swimming